

The Sarpo Laggo Glacier (Sarpo Laggo: 'young husband') is a glacier in the autonomous region Xinjiang of China, in the Karakoram mountain range of the Himalayas.

Geography 
Sarpo Laggo Glacier lies north of the Baltoro Muztagh range. It could be reached from the Baltoro glacier on the Pakistani side of the Karakorams via the Old Muztagh Pass northeast of the Trango Towers. It is, however, easier to approach the glacier from the Chinese side, starting a long hike at Kashgar on the Karakoram Highway and finally passing K2's northern base camp.
The glacier is named after Francis Younghusband, who was the first person to pass the Old Mustagh Pass and thus enter the Sarpo Laggo region. There is another glacier not far away, also named after him: Younghusband glacier (also known as Biango glacier) flows from Muztagh Tower towards the Baltoro Glacier.

See also
 Trans-Karakoram Tract
 Dafdar
 Shaksgam River
 Yinsugaiti Glacier
 Baltoro Glacier
 Trango Glacier
 Concordia (Pakistan)
 List of highest mountains
 List of glaciers

External links
 Photos from Concordia region by Kelly Cheng

Glaciers of China
Landforms of Xinjiang